Luke Nguyen's Vietnam is an Australian television series first screened on SBS One in 2010. The series follows chef, Luke Nguyen, as he tours Vietnam seeking culinary delights and adventure. It is regularly broadcast on Good Food, a UK food-orientated TV channel.

Luke Nguyen
Luke Nguyen (born 1978) is a Vietnamese Australian chef, best known as the host of television series Luke Nguyen's Vietnam. The series is a food documentary, in which he travels through Vietnam, cooking in the ad hoc manner of the street vendors in the country, usually preparing the dish on the footpaths. He appeared on MasterChef Australia (season 2) as a guest chef.

He is also the owner of Red Lantern restaurant in Surry Hills, Sydney and is the author of a number of cook books.

He's a current judge of MasterChef Vietnam.

Season One
 Episode 1: Saigon
 Episode 2: Saigon
 Episode 3: Mekong delta
 Episode 4: Phu Quoc Island
 Episode 5: Phan thiet and mui ne
 Episode 6: Dalat
 Episode 7: Nha trang
 Episode 8: Quy nhon
 Episode 9: Hoi an
 Episode 10: Hoi an 2

Season Two
 Episode 1: Hue
 Episode 2: Vinh
 Episode 3: Ninh Binh
 Episode 4: Hanoi
 Episode 5: Greater Hanoi
 Episode 6: Sapa
 Episode 7: Sapa 2
 Episode 8: Bac Ha
 Episode 9: Halong Bay
 Episode 10: Mai Chau

References

External links 
 Luke Nguyen's Vietnam on SBS

Special Broadcasting Service original programming
Australian cooking television series